The Siemens SX45 is a PDA mobile phone released by Siemens in 2002. It was one of the first Pocket PCs with mobile phone functionality. Because of its size and the fact that phone calls could only be made using a headset, it was not really in the same marketing segment as current smartphones.

It was replaced by the Siemens SX56.

Specifications
Software Environment: 
Operating System:  	Microsoft Pocket PC (Rapier) CE 3.0
Microprocessor : 
CPU:  		64bit NEC VR4122 MIPS class II
CPU Clock:	150 MHz
Memory, Storage capacity:
ROM capacity:	16 MB
RAM capacity:	32 MB
Hard Disk capacity:	1Gb IBM MicroDrive accessed through Compact Flash slot
Display:
Display Type:	Colour transflective TFT, 65536 scales
Display Resolution:	240 x 320
Display Diagonal:	3.5 "
Sound:
Microphone:		Mono
Speaker:		Mono
Audio Output:	Siemens specific Lumberg jack
Cellular Phone: 
Cellular Networks:	GSM900, GSM1800
Cellular Data Link:	CSD,(GPRS only available on SX45i)
Call Alert:		1 -chord melody
Control Peripherals: 
Positioning Device:	Touch screen
Primary Keyboard:	Not supported
Directional Pad:	4 -way block & Jog / Scroll Wheel	
Interfaces:
Expansion Slots:	CF I., CF II., MMC, SD
Serial:		RS-232, 115200bit/s
USB:			USB 1.1 client, 12Mbit/s, Proprietary connector
Infrared Gate:	115200bit/s (SIR/CIR)
Bluetooth:		Not supported
Wireless LAN:	Via Wireless Compact Flash (symbol Networker)
Multimedia Telecommunication 
Analog TV:		Not supported
Analog Radio:	Via Radio CF card
Power Supply 
Battery :		Lithium-ion, removable
Battery Capacity:	1550 mAh

References
Siemens SX45 specifications at GSM Arena

Smartphones
SX45
Mobile phones with infrared transmitter